The 2006 Canoe Sprint European Championships were held in Račice, Czech Republic.

Medal overview

Men

Women

Medal table

References

External links
 European Canoe Association

Canoe Sprint European Championships
2006 in Czech sport
2006 in canoeing
Canoeing and kayaking competitions in the Czech Republic